For more detailed character information, see List of In Plain Sight characters.
Below is a list of actors and actresses that are or were part of the cast of the American drama television series In Plain Sight. 

The show's main stars have included, at some point, Mary McCormack, Fred Weller, Nichole Hiltz, Todd Williams, Lesley Ann Warren, Paul Ben-Victor, Cristián de la Fuente, and Rachel Boston.

Cast

References

External links 
 Full cast and crew of In Plain Sight on the Internet Movie Database

Lists of actors by drama television series
Cast members